The 1972 Giro d'Italia was the 55th edition of the Giro d'Italia, one of cycling's Grand Tours. The Giro began in Venice on 21 May, and Stage 11 occurred on 1 June with a stage to Forte dei Marmi. The race finished in Milan on 11 June.

Stage 1
21 May 1972 — Venice to Ravenna,

Stage 2
22 May 1972 — Ravenna to Fermo,

Stage 3
23 May 1972 — Porto San Giorgio to Francavilla al Mare,

Stage 4a
24 May 1972 — Francavilla al Mare to Blockhaus,

Stage 4b
24 May 1972 — Blockhaus to Foggia,

Stage 5
25 May 1972 — Foggia to Montesano sulla Marcellana,

Stage 6
26 May 1972 — Montesano sulla Marcellana to Cosenza,

Stage 7
27 May 1972 — Cosenza to Catanzaro,

Stage 8
28 May 1972 — Catanzaro to Reggio Calabria,

Stage 9
29 May 1972 — Messina to Messina,

Rest day
30 May 1972

Stage 10
31 May 1972 — Rome to Monte Argentario,

Stage 11
1 June 1972 — Monte Argentario to Forte dei Marmi,

References

1972 Giro d'Italia
Giro d'Italia stages